is a railway station on the Muroran Main Line of Hokkaido Railway Company (JR Hokkaido) located in Noboribetsu, Hokkaidō, Japan. The station is assigned the station number H31.

The station was opened by Hokkaido Colliery and Railway Company on December 1, 1901.

Washibetsu Locomotive Depot of Japan Freight Railway Company (JR Freight) is located nearby.

Adjacent stations

References 

Railway stations in Japan opened in 1901
Railway stations in Hokkaido Prefecture